André Thevet (1516 – 23 November 1590) was a French Franciscan priest, explorer, cosmographer and writer who travelled to the Near East and to South America in the 16th century. His most significant book was The New Found World, or Antarctike, which compiled a number of different sources and his own experience into what purported to be a firsthand account of his experiences in France Antarctique, a French settlement near modern Rio de Janeiro.

Life

Thevet was born in Angoulême in southwestern France. At ten years of age, he entered the convent of Franciscans of Angoulême. He visited Italy at the same time as Guillaume Rondelet. In 1549, thanks to the support of John, Cardinal of Lorraine, he embarked on an extended exploration trip to Asia, Greece, Rhodes, Palestine and Egypt. He accompanied the French ambassador Gabriel de Luetz to Istanbul.

Almost immediately after this expedition, he set sail again as the chaplain of the fleet of Nicolas Durand de Villegaignon, which intended to establish a French colony near what is now Rio de Janeiro, Brazil. Thevet arrived there on 10 November 1555 but only stayed in the colony for about 10 weeks before returning to France. He was made an almoner to Catherine de Médici and later was employed by the king.

Thevet claimed in his Histoire de deux voyages, inaccurately, to have accompanied Guillaume Le Testu to America in 1550.

Thevet died in Paris on 23 November 1590.

Written works

Soon after Thevet's return to France from the near East in 1554, he published an account of his voyage under the title Cosmographie du Levant. 

On his return from the Americas, Thevet published a book titled Les singularitez de la France Antarctique in 1557 or 1558. Although purportedly based on his own firsthand experiences, Thevet also used previous published sources as well as verbal accounts from other explorers and sailors and from indigenous Canadians who had been brought back to France.  Thevet later settled a court case with another scholar who claimed to have been responsible for the actual writing. An edition of Les singularitez de la France Antarctique was printed in Antwerp by Plantin in 1558, and an English edition, The New Found World, or Antarctike, was printed in 1568.

Thevet's use of such a variety of sources not otherwise printed, despite the considerable errors and contradictions, means that his work remains valuable for the ethnography of both eastern Canada and Brazil. Les singularitez de la France Antarctique contains the first descriptions in European texts of plants such as the manioc, pineapple, peanut and tobacco, as well as of the animals macaw, sloth and tapir. The text also includes an account of cannibalism that was one of the influences on Montaigne's essay on cannibalism.

Once Thevet was established as cosmographer to the French court, he compiled his Cosmographie Universelle, intended to describe every part of the known world. A dispute arose with a collaborator, François de Belleforest, who left Thevet's employ to publish his own Cosmographie in 1572 before Thevet's work finally appeared in 1575. 

In 1584, Thevet published a collection of biographies, Vrais pourtraits et vies des homes illustres, which was critical of Protestants. He left two unpublished manuscripts. One, Grand Insulaire, was an almanac of islands, and the other, Histoire de deux voyages, was an account of his travels.

Works 

 1554 Cosmographie de Levant. Lyon : Ian de Tournes et Guil. Gazeau, 
 1557/8 Les singularitez de la France Antarctique (in English in 1568 as The New found vvorlde, or Antarctike)
 1575 La Cosmographie Universelle d'Andre Thevet Cosmographe dv Roy. Illvstree de diverses figvres des choses plvs remarqvables veves par l'auteur, & incogneues de noz anciens & modernes, Paris, Pierre l'Huilier. 
 1584 Vrais pourtraits et vies des hommes illustres
 MS: Grand Insulaire, 
 MS  Histoire de deux voyages

See also
Antarctic France
Old Tupi

References

Sources
Cantacuzene, J. M. Frère André Thevet (1516-1590). Miscellanea (PDF file).

Further reading

Lestringant, Frank (2003). Sous la leçon des vents: le monde d'André Thevet, cosmographe de la Renaissance. Presses Paris Sorbonne.

Schlesinger, Roger and Arthur P. Stabler. André Thevet's North America: A Sixteenth Century View. McGill University Press, 1986.

External links

Les singularitez de la France Antarctique (Paris: 1558). Digitized by the John Carter Brown Library and available on Internet Archive
The new found worlde, or Antarctike (London: 1568). Digitized and available on Internet Archive.
Map of America in La Cosmographie Universelle (Paris: 1575). Digitized by the National Library of Australia.

1516 births
1590 deaths
People from Angoulême
French explorers
Historiography of Brazil
French military chaplains
French Navy chaplains
France Antarctique